The MHT-CET or Common Entrance Test is an annual entrance exam conducted by the Government of Maharashtra. It is conducted by the Directorate of Technical Education. The degree courses of the following streams are mainly accounted for in this entrance exam:
 Engineering
 Pharmacy
 Law
 Management

Earlier the test scores were also used for admissions to Medical degree courses. After the Supreme Court of India insisted that only NEET can be used for undergraduate medicine admissions all over India, MHT-CET has been scrapped for medical colleges. 
The test is conducted in online mode for the first time in 2019. The State Common Entrance Test Cell, Maharashtra released the syllabus and marking scheme for the Computer Based Test (CBT).

References

Sources 
https://www.mahacet.org/cetcell/wp-content/uploads/2019/01/Draft-Copy-of-MHT-CET-2019-Information-Brochure-for-Engg_Tech_Pharmacy_Pharm.D..pdf  MHT-CET 2020 Brochure

External links
 Engineering MHT-CET - 
Times of India news article
https://www.indiatoday.in/education-today/notification/story/mht-cet-2019-exam-divd-1390422-2018-11-17

 Education in Maharashtra
Standardised tests in India
Year of establishment missing